The  black-capped robin (Heteromyias armiti) is a species of bird in the family Petroicidae native to New Guinea. The black-capped robin has been split from the ashy robin (Heteromyias albispecularis) .

References

black-capped robin
Birds of New Guinea
black-capped robin
black-capped robin